"Finetime" is the debut single by the Liverpool britpop band Cast, fronted by ex La's bassist John Power. The song is taken from the debut album All Change.

Finetime was first performed acoustically by John Power with the La's at a Liverpool free festival.

Track listing
 "Finetime" – 3:06
 "Better Man" – 2:59
 "Satellites" – 3:40

Personnel
Cast
 John Power – vocals, guitar
 Peter Wilkinson – backing vocals, bass
 Liam "Skin" Tyson – guitar
 Keith O'Neill – drums

Production
 John Leckie – producer, mixing

Chart performance

References

1995 debut singles
Cast (band) songs
Polydor Records singles
Song recordings produced by John Leckie
Songs written by John Power (musician)
1995 songs